Trushkin  (feminine: Trushkina) is a Russian surname. Notable people with the surname include:

Igor Trushkin (born 1994), Russian futsal player
Vladislav Trushkin (born 1993), Russian basketball player

Russian-language surnames